Michael Hogue (born 31 March 1975) is an Australian former professional rugby league footballer who played in the 1990s.

Background
Born in Townsville, Queensland, Hogue played his junior rugby league for Townsville Brothers and attended Ignatius Park College.

Playing career
In 1994, Hogue represented the Queensland under-19 side, before signing with the North Queensland Cowboys.

In Round 14 of the 1995 ARL season, Hogue made his first grade debut for the Cowboys in a 10-40 loss to the Penrith Panthers. A week later, he played in the club's first ever home win, a 31-12 victory over the Western Suburbs Magpies. In 1997, after spending the 1996 season in reserve grade, he joined Paris Saint-Germain for the Super League II season.

References

1975 births
Living people
Australian rugby league players
North Queensland Cowboys players
Paris Saint-Germain Rugby League players
Rugby league props
Rugby league players from Townsville